La Guardia de Jaén or Guardia de Jaén, La (official name), and the old Mentesa Bastia at Iberic and Roman era, is a small city located in the province of Jaén (Spain) at western end of Sierra Mágina, on the Cerro de San Marcos, near the promontory of Cerro de San Cristóbal, from where it dominates the valley of the river Guadalbullón.

See also
Convent of Santo Domingo, La Guardia de Jaén

References

External links 
 La Guardia de Jaén (Official Website).
 La Guardia de Jaén - Sistema de Información Multiterritorial de Andalucía

Municipalities in the Province of Jaén (Spain)